Wu Kuo-hui (born 19 April 1972) is a Taiwanese judoka. He competed in the men's middleweight event at the 1996 Summer Olympics.

References

1972 births
Living people
Taiwanese male judoka
Olympic judoka of Taiwan
Judoka at the 1996 Summer Olympics
Place of birth missing (living people)
20th-century Taiwanese people